Dzongkha is a Sino-Tibetan language that is the official and national language of Bhutan. It is written using the Tibetan script.

The word  means "the language of the fortress", from  "fortress" and  "language". , Dzongkha had 171,080 native speakers and about 640,000 total speakers.

Dzongkha is a South Tibetic language. It is closely related to and partially intelligible with Sikkimese, and to some other Bhutanese languages such as Chocha Ngacha, Brokpa, Brokkat and Lakha. It has a more distant relationship to Standard Tibetan. Spoken Dzongkha and Tibetan are around 50 to 80 percent mutually intelligible.

Usage
Dzongkha and its dialects are the native tongue of eight western districts of Bhutan (viz. Wangdue Phodrang, Thimphu, Gasa, Paro, Ha, Dagana and Chukha). There are also some native speakers near the Indian town of Kalimpong, once part of Bhutan but now in North Bengal and in Sikkim.

Dzongkha was declared the national language of Bhutan in 1971. Dzongkha study is mandatory in all schools, and the language is the lingua franca in the districts to the south and east where it is not the mother tongue. The Bhutanese films Travellers and Magicians (2003) and Lunana: A Yak in the Classroom (2019) are in Dzongkha.

Writing system

The Tibetan script used to write Dzongkha has thirty basic letters, sometimes known as "radicals", for consonants. Dzongkha is usually written in Bhutanese forms of the Uchen script, forms of the Tibetan script known as Jôyi "cursive longhand" and Jôtshum "formal longhand". The print form is known simply as Tshûm.

Romanization
There are various systems of romanization and transliteration for Dzongkha, but none accurately represents its phonetic sound. The Bhutanese government adopted a transcription system known as Roman Dzongkha, devised by the linguist George van Driem, as its standard in 1991.

Phonology

Tones 
Dzongkha is a tonal language and has two level tones (high and low), and two contour tone distinctions, totaling four tones. The tone of a syllable determines the allophone of the onset and the phonation type of the nuclear vowel.

Consonants 

All consonants may begin a syllable. In the onsets of low-tone syllables, consonants are voiced. The rhotic  is usually a trill  or a fricative trill , and is voiceless in the onsets of high-tone syllables.

 are dental. Descriptions of the palatal affricates and fricatives vary from alveolo-palatal to plain palatal.

Only a few consonants are found in syllable-final positions. Syllable-final  is often elided and results in the preceding vowel nasalized and prolonged, especially word-finally. Syllable-final  is most often omitted when word-final as well, unless in formal speech. In literary pronunciation, liquids  and  may also end a syllable. Though rare,  is also found in syllable-final positions. No other consonants are found in syllable-final positions.

Vowels 

 When in low tone, vowels are produced with breathy voice.
 Descriptions of  vary between close-mid  and open-mid .
  is close-mid , but may approach open-mid  especially in closed syllables.  is close-mid .
  is slightly lower than open-mid, i.e. .
  may approach , especially in closed syllables.

Phonotactics 
Many words in Dzongkha are monosyllabic. Syllables usually take the form of CVC, CV, or VC. Syllables with complex onsets are also found, but such an onset must be a combination of an unaspirated bilabial stop and a palatal affricate. The bilabial stops in complex onsets are often omitted in colloquial speech.

Classification and related languages
Dzongkha is considered a South Tibetic language. It is closely related to and partially intelligible with Sikkimese, and to some other Bhutanese languages such as Chocha Ngacha, Brokpa, Brokkat and Lakha.

Dzongkha bears a close linguistic relationship to J'umowa, which is spoken in the Chumbi Valley of Southern Tibet. It has a much more distant relationship to Standard Tibetan. Spoken Dzongkha and Tibetan are around 50% to 80% mutually intelligible, with the literary forms of both highly influenced by the liturgical (clerical) Classical Tibetan language, known in Bhutan as Chöke, which has been used for centuries by Buddhist monks. Chöke was used as the language of education in Bhutan until the early 1960s when it was replaced by Dzongkha in public schools.

Although descended from Classical Tibetan, Dzongkha shows a great many irregularities in sound changes that make the official spelling and standard pronunciation more distant from each other than is the case with Standard Tibetan. "Traditional orthography and modern phonology are two distinct systems operating by a distinct set of rules."

Sample text
The following is a sample text in Dzongkha of Article 1 of the Universal Declaration of Human Rights:

See also

Dzongkha Braille
Dzongkha numerals
Languages of Bhutan

References

Bibliography

 
 
 
 
 
 
 
 
 Mazaudon, Martine. 1985. “Dzongkha Number Systems.” S. Ratanakul, D. Thomas & S. Premsirat (eds.). Southeast Asian Linguistic Studies presented to André-G. Haudricourt. Bangkok: Mahidol University. 124–57
 
 
 
 
 

 
 
 

 
 
  - A language textbook with three audio compact disks.

External links

Bhutanese literatures  
Dzongkha Development Commission Thimphu, Bhutan
Dzongkha-English Dictionary
Dzongkha podcast
Dzongkha Romanization for Geographical Names
Free textbooks and dictionaries published by the Dzongkha Development Commission
Bhutan National Policy and Strategy for Development and Promotion of Dzongkha
 Dzongkha Unicode  – site  The National Library of Bhutan (en – dz )

Vocabulary
 Online searchable dictionary (Dz-En, En-Dz, Dz-Dz) or Online Dzongkha-English Dictionary  – site  Dzongkha Development Commission (en – dz)
 Dzongkha Computer Terms(pdf)
 English-Dzongkha Pocket Dictionary(pdf)
 Rigpai Lodap: An Intermediate Dzongkha-English Dictionary(pdf)
 Kartshok Threngwa: A Book on Dzongkha Synonyms & Antonyms(pdf)
 Names of Countries and Capitals in Dzongkha(pdf)
 A Guide to Dzongkha-Translation(pdf)

Grammar
  A colloquial grammar of the Bhutanese language. by Byrne, St. Quintin. Allahabad: Pioneer Press, 1909
 Dzongkha transliteration  – site  National Library of Bhutan (en – dz )
 Dzongkha, The National Language of Bhutan – site  Dzongkha Linux (en – dz)
 Romanization of Dzongkha
 Dzongkha : Origin and Description
 Dzongkha language, alphabet and pronunciation
 Dzongkha in Wikipedia: Русский, Français, 日本語, Eesti, English
 Pioneering Dzongkha Text To Speech Synthesis (pdf)
 Dzongkha Grammar & other materials – site  The Dzongkha Development Commission (en – dz)
 Коряков Ю.Б. Практическая транскрипция для языка дзонг-кэ
 Classical Tibetan-Dzongkha Dictionary(pdf)

 
Languages of Bhutan
Languages written in Tibetan script